The 2021 Solheim Cup was the 17th edition of the Solheim Cup matches, held from September 4–6 at the Inverness Club in Toledo, Ohio. The Solheim Cup is a biennial team competition between the top women professional golfers from Europe and the United States. Pat Hurst was captain of the U.S. team for the first time and Catriona Matthew was captain of the European team for the second time.

The 2021 competition was won by Europe with 15 points to 13. It was the second victory by the European team in America, having first won there in 2013.

Format
The competition is a three-day match play event between teams of twelve players with a similar format to the Ryder Cup, with each match worth one point. The format is as follows:
Day 1 (Saturday): Four foursome (alternate shot) matches in a morning session and four fourball (better ball) matches in an afternoon session. A total of eight players from each team participate in each session.
Day 2 (Sunday): Four foursome (alternate shot) matches in a morning session and four fourball (better ball) matches in an afternoon session. A total of eight players from each team participate in each session.
Day 3 (Monday): 12 singles matches. All 12 players from each team participate.

With a total of 28 points, 14 points are required to win the Cup, and 14 points are required for the defending champion to retain the Cup. All matches are played to a maximum of 18 holes. If the score is even after 18 holes, each team earns one-half point.

Team qualification and selection

Eligibility criteria
The European and United States teams had different eligibility criteria:

Team Europe

Members of the European team must:
be current members of the Ladies European Tour in any category or membership;
must be a "European national". To be a "European national", the player must satisfy the criteria set out in the "Nationality Policy" issued by the International Golf Federation.
There is no longer a minimum number of LET Ranking Events that must be played.

Team USA

Members of the United States team must be current members of the LPGA Tour and meet one of these three citizenship criteria:
 U.S. citizens by birth, regardless of their birthplace.
 Those who were naturalized as U.S. citizens before age 18.
 Those who became U.S. citizens by adoption before age 13.

Team selection
The European and United States teams are selected by different methods.

Team Europe

Team Europe consists of the top two players from the LET Solheim Cup standings, followed by the top four LET members on the Women's World Golf Rankings who were not already qualified via the Solheim Cup standings, and six captain's selections. The 2021 Women's British Open, held at Carnoustie Golf Links, Scotland, ending on August 22, was the final event of the qualification period, and the full team, including the captain's picks, was announced on August 23.

Team USA

Team USA consists of the leading seven players from the LPGA Solheim Cup points rankings, the top two players in the Women's World Golf Rankings not already qualified via the points rankings and three chosen by the team captain. LPGA Solheim Cup points are earned for top-20 finishes on the LPGA Tour over a two-year period ending on August 22 with the 2021 Women's British Open. Points are doubled in major championships, and top-20 finishes during the 2021 LPGA Tour season earned 50% more points than those in 2019 and 2020.

Teams
Ages on first day of matches, September 4; Rolex rankings at team selection on August 23. Captain's picks shown in yellow.

Source:

Source:

Day one
Saturday, September 4, 2021

Morning foursomes

Afternoon four-ball

Day two
Sunday, September 5, 2021

Morning foursomes

Afternoon four-ball

Day three
Monday, September 6, 2021

Singles

Source:

Individual player records
Each entry refers to the win–loss–half record of the player.

Europe

United States

References

External links

Solheim Cup
Golf in Ohio
Sports competitions in Ohio
Solheim Cup
Solheim Cup
Solheim Cup
Solheim Cup